The Lukoml Power Station (Lukoml GRES, Lukomlskaya GRES, Lukomlskaya DRES) is a natural gas-fired thermal power station located in Novolukoml, Vitsebsk Voblast, Belarus.  It is operated by Belenergo.

Construction of the power station started in 1964. It was built in two stages.  At the first stage, four double-boiler single-turbine units, each of 300 MW capacity, were commissioned in December 1969–September 1971.  At the second stage, four single-boiler single-turbine units, each of 300 MW capacity, were added in December 1972–August 1974.  In 2000s the generation units were upgraded by 10% increasing the installed capacity up to 2,640 MW.

Gallery

References

External links

 Soviet military map N-35-47 (1:100,000)

Buildings and structures in Vitebsk Region
Natural gas-fired power stations in Belarus
Power stations built in the Soviet Union
Chashniki District